Crawford Depot is a historic train station in Crawford, Oglethorpe County, Georgia. It was added to the National Register of Historic Places on May 27, 1977. The depot is located on U.S. 78; it dates from ca. 1848 and is used to house the Oglethorpe County Chamber of Commerce.

According to local history, the building was constructed from Lithonia granite crossties which had been used by the Georgia Railroad. It's a rare example of a stone depot built by the Georgia Railroad.

It is the only surviving stone depot building of the Georgia Railroad.

See also
National Register of Historic Places listings in Oglethorpe County, Georgia

References

Railway stations on the National Register of Historic Places in Georgia (U.S. state)
Railway stations in the United States opened in 1848
Buildings and structures in Oglethorpe County, Georgia
National Register of Historic Places in Oglethorpe County, Georgia
Former railway stations in Georgia (U.S. state)